Lamontopterus is a genus of prehistoric eurypterid classified within the family Kokomopteridae. It contains one species, Lamontopterus knoxae, from the Early Silurian of Scotland.

See also
 List of eurypterids

References

Stylonurina
Silurian eurypterids
Eurypterids of Europe